North Skelton railway station was opened to freight on 1 August 1875 by the North Eastern Railway and to passengers on 1 July 1902. It served the village of Skelton-in-Cleveland in North Yorkshire, England. It closed to passengers on 15 January 1951, but opened again briefly on 18 June for the summer season before finally closing to passengers on 10 September of the same year. Freight traffic remained until 1 February 1952. In October 1956 the station was reopened to freight as a private siding which was finally closed on 21 January 1964.

The line remains open as a single-track goods line from Boulby and Skinningrove to Teesside, but most of the station buildings and the platforms have been removed. Only the stationmaster's house remains as a private residence.

References

External links
History of the station
 North Skelton station on navigable 1955 O. S. map

Disused railway stations in Redcar and Cleveland
Former North Eastern Railway (UK) stations
Railway stations in Great Britain opened in 1902
Railway stations in Great Britain closed in 1951
Skelton-in-Cleveland